Charlie Davis (born July 18, 1965) is an American politician. He was a member of the Missouri House of Representatives from 2011 to 2019. He is a member of the Republican Party.

References

1965 births
21st-century American politicians
Living people
Republican Party members of the Missouri House of Representatives